The commune of Muramvya is a commune of the Muramvya Province in central-western Burundi. The capital lies at Muramvya.

References

Communes of Burundi
Muramvya Province